MI-16, MI16, MI 16 or variant may refer to:

 MI16, British Military Intelligence Section 16
 Mil Mi-16 aka Mil V-16, helicopter
 Michigan's 16th congressional district
 U.S. Route 16 in Michigan, highway
 Some DOHC 16 valve versions of PSA_XU, XU9 and XU10